The 1993 Tel Aviv Open was a men's tennis tournament played on outdoor hard courts that was part of the World Series of the 1993 ATP Tour. It was played at the Israel Tennis Centers in the Tel Aviv District city of Ramat HaSharon, Israel from October 11 through October 18, 1993. Unseeded Stefano Pescosolido won the singles title.

Finals

Singles

 Stefano Pescosolido defeated  Amos Mansdorf 7–6(7–5), 7–5
 It was Pescosolido's only title of the year and the 2nd of his career.

Doubles

 Sergio Casal /  Emilio Sánchez defeated  Mike Bauer /  David Rikl 6–4, 6–4
 It was Casal's 3rd title of the year and the 43rd of his career. It was Sánchez's 3rd title of the year and the 60th of his career.

References